Marielle Franco (born Marielle Francisco da Silva, 27 July 1979 – 14 March 2018) was a Brazilian politician, sociologist, feminist, socialist and human rights activist.  After earning a master's degree in public administration from the Fluminense Federal University, she served as a city councillor of the Municipal Chamber of Rio de Janeiro for the Socialism and Liberty Party (PSOL) from January 2017 until her death.

On 14 March 2018, while in a car after delivering a speech in the north of Rio de Janeiro, Franco and her driver were shot multiple times and killed by two murderers travelling in another vehicle. Franco had been an outspoken critic of police brutality and extrajudicial killings, as well as the February 2018 federal intervention by Brazilian president Michel Temer in the state of Rio de Janeiro which resulted in the deployment of the army in police operations. In March 2019, two former police officers were arrested and charged with the murder of Marielle Franco.

Early life
Franco was raised in Maré, a slum in northern Rio de Janeiro, where she also resided for most of her life, and began to work to contribute to the household income in 1990 when she was 11 years old. She had a sister, Anielle.

Marielle gave birth to her first and only child in 1998 when she was 19 years old. Franco raised her daughter without the father's help and worked as a pre-school teacher on a minimum wage.

In 2004, Franco, who throughout her career fought for LGBT rights, started a romantic relationship with Mônica Benício. In 2017, the couple decided to move in together in the Tijuca neighborhood with Luyara, Marielle's daughter. Their wedding was scheduled for the end of 2018.

Education
In 2000, she began her pre-university studies. Following the death of a friend from a stray bullet in 2000, Franco began working in human rights activism.

In 2002, she entered the Pontifical Catholic University of Rio de Janeiro on a scholarship and continued working and raising her daughter as she worked towards a degree in social sciences. She subsequently earned a master's degree in public administration from the Fluminense Federal University. Her master's thesis (titled "UPP: The Reduction of the Favela to Three Letters") concerns the law enforcement program to retake control of Rio's favelas from gangs.

Political career

Beginning in 2007, Franco worked as a consultant for the state representative Marcelo Freixo, and she coordinated the state legislature's Committee for the Defense of Human Rights and Citizenship. She also worked for civil society organizations, including the Brazil Foundation and the Maré Center for Solidarity Studies and Action.

In 2016, Franco ran for a seat on the Rio de Janeiro city council in the municipal elections. As a black woman and single mother from the favelas, Franco positioned herself as a representative and defender of poor black women and people from the favelas. With over 46,500 votes, Franco was one of the 51 representatives elected, receiving the fifth highest vote total out of more than 1,500 candidates.

As a city council member, Franco fought against  violence against women, for reproductive rights, and for the rights of favela residents. She chaired the Women's Defense Commission and formed part of a four-person committee that monitored the federal intervention in Rio de Janeiro. Working with the Rio de Janeiro Lesbian Front, Franco presented a bill to create a day of lesbian visibility in Rio de Janeiro in August 2017, but the bill was defeated by a vote of 19–17.

Final days and assassination

On 13 March 2018, Franco spoke out on Twitter against the police violence in Rio de Janeiro: "Another homicide of a young man that could be credited to the police. Matheus Melo was leaving church when he was killed. How many others will have to die for this war to end?"

The next day, Franco attended a round-table discussion titled "Young Black Women Moving [Power] Structures". Less than two hours after leaving the round-table, she and her driver, Anderson Pedro Gomes, were fatally shot by two men who were driving another car. The men fired nine shots at them, four of which struck Franco – three in the head and one in the neck. Franco's press officer was next to her in the back seat and was injured, but survived.

Marcelo Freixo, a Rio de Janeiro legislative assembly member from PSOL who came to the scene shortly after hearing of her killing, determined that the bullets had been directed at her in a clear execution. According to the Rio de Janeiro police, the direction of the nine shots supports the hypothesis that Franco was assassinated. The bullets that killed Franco are from a batch bought by the federal police in Brasília in 2006; Minister of Public Security Raul Jungmann later said that they were stolen from a post office storage facility in Paraíba, but the ministry subsequently retracted this explanation after the Post Office publicly denied it.

In January 2019, police arrested Ronald Paulo Alves Pereira and issued a warrant for Adriano Magalhães da Nóbrega, both suspects in Franco's assassination. Each suspect received honors from president Jair Bolsonaro's son Flávio Bolsonaro in the early 2000s. Nóbrega's wife and mother were still being employed in Flávio Bolsonaro's office in 2018.

In March 2019, police arrested two suspects, former members of the military police allegedly tied to a vigilante militia, for the murder. Prior to their arrest, both suspects had pictures taken with former President Jair Bolsonaro, and one was his neighbor at a luxury apartment complex in Rio. In November 2019, a number of Brazilian media outlets reported that police were investigating possible ties of President Bolsonaro's second son, Carlos, to the case.

Reactions 

Thousands took to the streets in coordinated protests across Brazil, and both Amnesty International and Human Rights Watch condemned her killing. In the United States, Black feminist scholars published a statement honouring Marielle as "yet another martyr" for the Movement for Black Lives.

Journalist Glenn Greenwald, whose husband David Miranda was a fellow City Council member at the time of her assassination and was a close personal friend of Franco's, listed what he referred to as the "most important subjects to cover" regarding Franco's assassination stating:

"Her relentless and brave activism against the most lawless police battalions, her opposition to military intervention, and, most threateningly of all, her growing power as a black, gay woman from the favela seeking not to join Brazil's power structure, but to subvert it."

The double murder of Marielle and her driver Anderson was the subject of condemnation across the political spectrum in Brazil. All presidential candidates in Brazil during the 2018 campaign condemned the crime, except for former President Jair Bolsonaro, who repeatedly declined to comment on the case; his campaign alleged that his views on the subject would be too controversial, despite his being the campaign that most exploited security issues prior to election day.

2022, President Lula announced the appointment of her sister, Anielle Franco, as Minister of Racial Equality.

Legacy 
A digital art workshop was held in Nairobi, Kenya titled "Portraits of Marielle: Creating Bridges between Kenya and Brazil" with young Kenyan artists participating, and the artworks were displayed at the Maré Museum in Rio de Janeiro on 10 November 2018.

Amnesty International included Franco's name in its campaign for those who wrote for human rights and lost their lives, while an update was made and an online tribute listed Franco among over 400 human rights advocates for women by the Association for Women's Rights in Development.

A docu-series titled Marielle – O Documentário was released by Globoplay on March 13, 2020.

Version 19 of antiX, a Linux distribution based on Debian Stable, is named after Marielle Franco.

Personal life
Franco identified as bisexual. In 2017, she moved to the Rio de Janeiro neighbourhood of Tijuca with her partner, Mônica Tereza Benício, and her 18-year-old daughter, Luyara Santos. Marielle and Mônica had met during a trip with friends when they were 18 and 24 years old, respectively. They had been dating for 13 years, although the relationship had often been interrupted due to the non-acceptance of their families and friends. During the interruptions, Mônica had relationships with other women and men and Marielle with other men. Franco and Benício had been planning to marry in September 2018.

See also
 List of assassinations § Brazil

References

External links

, by The Guardian

1979 births
2018 deaths
Activists from Rio de Janeiro (city)
Afro-Brazilian women
Brazilian politicians of African descent
Assassinated Brazilian politicians
Brazilian feminists
Brazilian women in politics
Brazilian LGBT politicians
LGBT Afro-Brazilians
Afro-Brazilian feminists
Municipal Chamber of Rio de Janeiro councillors
Pontifical Catholic University of Rio de Janeiro alumni
Socialism and Liberty Party politicians
Brazilian sociologists
Brazilian socialists
Bisexual politicians
Bisexual feminists
Police brutality in Brazil
Female murder victims
Brazilian critics
Brazilian anti-poverty advocates
Deaths by firearm in Brazil
People shot dead by law enforcement officers in Brazil
Women city councillors in Brazil